Stonehouse railway station is a railway station that serves the town of Stonehouse in Gloucestershire, England. The station is located on the Swindon-Gloucester "Golden Valley" line.

History

The station was formerly called Stonehouse Burdett Road to distinguish it from a second station, Stonehouse (Bristol Road), on the line between Bristol and Gloucester. Stonehouse Bristol Road closed to passengers under the Beeching Axe in 1965 and to goods traffic the following year.

Description
The station has two platforms, and is operated by Great Western Railway. The station has a ticket office, located on the Gloucester-bound platform; it is normally only open in the mornings, until the end of the peak period.

The platforms are short: only about  each. This is long enough to accommodate the two-coach trains used on  –  local services; but Class 800s running to or from London or Cheltenham Spa may be up to nine coaches. Since long trains cannot be accommodated entirely, such trains running towards Gloucester normally stop with the front two coaches in the platform, and those running toward London normally stop with the rear two in the platform. Passengers intending to alight at Stonehouse are advised earlier in their journeys to proceed along the train to the relevant coaches. Since trains from Cheltenham reverse at Gloucester, this can lead to confusion for cyclists as to which end of the train in which to load their bicycles.

Station upgrade
In December 2017 the station completed a £300,000 upgrade. The work included ground levelling, improved access and a new footbridge.

In 2018, improvements were made to the provision of service information for passengers, comprising the installation of LED dot-matrix passenger information screens and the provision of automated announcements.

Works to extend the short platforms by around 100m were completed in 2019. These changes were required for introduction of Class 166 trains, which are longer than the previous rolling stock used on the line.

Services
Trains call hourly in each direction Mon-Sat. On Sundays, Hourly services between Cheltenham and Swindon with 3 services a day onwards to Paddington.

References

External links
 Old photos of Stonehouse Burdett Road Station - Stonehouse History Group
 

Stroud District
Railway stations in Gloucestershire
DfT Category E stations
Former Great Western Railway stations
Railway stations in Great Britain opened in 1845
Railway stations served by Great Western Railway